Two Sisters (Chinese: 姐妹) is a 2019 Malaysian Mandarin-language psychological horror film by James Lee. The film follows two sisters who reunite after one of them is discharged from the asylum. As they move back to their abandoned haunted family house, a tragic family secret unfolds.

It was released on 18 April 2019 in Malaysia. The film's score, written by composer Nick Davis, won the award for Best Original Score at the 30th Malaysian Film Festival in 2019.

Plot
Following younger sister Mei Yue's release from an asylum, she is released into the care of her older sister Mei Xue. Together they move back to their abandoned family house. When Mei Yue starts seeing unexplained things, she begins to question if she is losing her mind again. Is their house is actually haunted? At the same time, the two sisters harbor a dark and tragic family secret from the past, which soon begins to unfold after their return.

Cast 
 Emily Lim as Mei Xi, older sister
 Lim Mei Fen as Mei Yue, younger sister
 Joyce Harn
 Angelyna Khoo
 Kym Tan
 Venice Ng
 Adery Chin
 Chai Zi
 William Boo
 Paige Chan
 Julianne Tan
 Mike Chuah
 Tan Li Yang

Production
The film production was reportedly relatively low, with RM300,000. It is the first film by Kuman Pictures, a film production house founded in 2018 which produces low-budget horror and thriller films.

Reception
Asian Movie Pulse said the film "has some minor flaws but still manages enough to like that it’s entirely watchable and enjoyable."

References

External links 
 
 Two Sisters on Cinema.com.my
 Two Sisters on Popcorn Malaysia

Malaysian horror films
Films about sisters
2010s Mandarin-language films
2010s psychological horror films